The gluteal aponeurosis is a fibrous membrane, from the fascia lata, that lies between the iliac crest and the superior border of the gluteus maximus. A part of the gluteus medius arises from this membrane.

Pelvis